The 2018 Internazionali di Tennis d'Abruzzo was a professional tennis tournament played on clay courts. It was the second edition of the tournament which was part of the 2018 ATP Challenger Tour. It took place in Francavilla al Mare, Italy between 23 and 29 April 2018.

Singles main-draw entrants

Seeds

 1 Rankings are as of 16 April 2018.

Other entrants
The following players received wildcards into the singles main draw:
  Filippo Baldi
  Gian Marco Moroni
  Andrea Pellegrino
  Gianluigi Quinzi

The following players received entry from the qualifying draw:
  Joris De Loore
  Antoine Hoang
  Dimitar Kuzmanov
  Luca Vanni

The following players received entry as lucky losers:
  Elliot Benchetrit
  Kimmer Coppejans
  Matteo Viola
  Zhang Zhizhen

Champions

Singles

 Gianluigi Quinzi def.  Casper Ruud 6–4, 6–1.

Doubles

 Julian Ocleppo /  Andrea Vavassori def.  Ariel Behar /  Máximo González 7–6(7–5), 7–6(7–3).

References

2018 ATP Challenger Tour
Internazionali di Tennis d'Abruzzo